The Scottish Challenge is a golf tournament on the Challenge Tour. It was held annually from 2006 to 2018, and in 2022.

Winners

Notes

References

External links
Official coverage on the Challenge Tour's official site

Former Challenge Tour events
Golf tournaments in Scotland
Sport in Highland (council area)
Annual sporting events in the United Kingdom
Recurring sporting events established in 2006
2006 establishments in Scotland